"The Voice" is a poem by English author Thomas Hardy, which was published in Satires of Circumstance 1914.

The Voice

References

Poetry by Thomas Hardy